Ray is a science fiction manga by Akihito Yoshitomi that ran in Champion Red magazine from 2002 to 2006 and was compiled in seven volumes. An anime television series adaptation titled Ray the Animation was broadcast in Japan from April 6, 2006 through June 29, 2006. The anime series was produced by Tezuka Productions and animated by OLM.

Plot
The story takes place in the near future, and describes a young girl living in an institution that raised children in order to sell their organs on the black organ transplant market. Her original eyes were taken and she was rescued and outfitted with a pair of new X-ray eyes by the underground doctor Black Jack and then adopted by a surgeon named Dr. Kasugano.

Ten years later, Ray took up her mother's profession and become a well known and respected surgeon because of her unique abilities and sharp skill. After beginning work at a less-than-typical hospital, Ray is faced with bizarre cases that require her specials skills. In the second half of the series she begins to uncover details about the organization that removed her eyes and the whereabouts of the other children with whom she was raised. The storylines take up bioethical issues such as organ donation, human cloning and even reincarnation.

Like its counterpart Black Jack 21, the show favors science-fiction elements in place of realism, with cases often resembling actual medical conditions but with fantastical elements added to heighten drama.

Characters

Main characters

Ray is the main character and an expert surgeon. She started life as a clone, raised along with other children by a mysterious organization as a source for organ donation. The children had no names, only numbers, and because the identifying numbers on her back "075 - 1 - 74" equal zero when subtracted, she called herself "Ray" as Rei is the Japanese word for zero. After her original eyes were taken, she was rescued and outfitted with a pair of new X-ray eyes by the underground doctor Black Jack and then adopted by a surgeon named Dr. Kasugano. Ray is often thought of as distant and private by her co-workers and her cool demeanor and precision with a scalpel make her a sought-out surgeon for difficult cases. She is disturbed by memories of her childhood and searches for the children with whom she was raised, especially her first love, Kouichi but she also begins to like Shinoyama Toshiaki too.

Toshiaki Shinoyama is a manufacturer of artificial organs that he claims are "top of the line." Shinoyama is Ray's business partner and harbors romantic feelings for her. Often depicted as a playboy and a slacker, he cares deeply for the people who depend on him. Despite Ray's seeming indifference (and often annoyance) with him, Shinoyama has expressed that he is happy with their relationship even if it remains the same, and claims that he will leave if he can no longer be of service to Ray. However, in later episodes he feels conflicted by the reappearance of Koichi, and is continually goaded by Misato to make the first move.

Aka Ribbon was one of the children raised with Ray and like many of the children, she named herself after her most valuable possession. She and Ray were separated until being reunited ten years later in the hospital where Ray worked. Red Ribbon suffered from amnesia after being found at the scene of an accident and at first did not recognize Ray. It was later revealed that she was sent by the organization that raised her and Ray. She was carrying a dangerous mind-controlling parasite which possessed several staff members until Ray was able to remove it. She moved in with Ray and often tagged along on patient visits. Her childlike demeanor is often used as comic relief during particularly heavy story-lines. In later episodes she is shown to be more aware of her situation and begins to show hostility towards Ray indicating she may have been fully aware of her situation from the start. It is later revealed that she was working with Koichi to keep tabs on Ray and may not have had amnesia. Red Ribbon is deeply in love with Koichi, but she dies after being shot by him when she threatens to harm Ray in a jealous rage.

Hospital characters

Director Sawa is the director of the hospital. He has a long dark beard and wears a distinctive eyepatch which gives him an intimidating appearance but he is actually quite caring about both his patients and staff. He rescued Ray 10 years earlier when she was left for dead and lost his right eye and leg in the process. He worked with Dr. Kasugano and the H Ring man before they separated 20 years earlier.

Dr. Kasugano is Ray's adoptive mother and a surgeon. She worked along with Sawa and the H Ring man to establish a hospital 20 years earlier. After Ray was rescued, Kasugano took her in and raised Ray as her own child, hoping that she would never have to reveal her daughter's true origins. Presented as a kind and caring mother, Kasugano taught Ray all she knows about being a surgeon and appears near the end of the series to help her adopted daughter reconcile with their shared past.

Misato is the nurse who first encountered Ray and her ability at the scene of an accident. She wears a double bun haristyle and glasses. Like all the nurses at the hospital, she appears skilled in martial arts and singlehandedly took on a group of thugs trying to stop an operation.

Rie is another nurse with pigtails who works with Misato. She often suggests absurd-sounding reasons for an illness that may or may not be the case. She is the cheeriest of the hospital nurses and a good friend of Mami and Rumi.

Rumi is a nurse at the hospital often seen with Rie and Mami. She has an un-reciprocated crush on Shinoyama and a generally shy and nervous personality.

Mami is the fourth nurse and the quietest of the group. It is implied that she may be a lesbian or bisexual.

Sumire is a childhood acquaintance of Shinoyama, referring to him by the intimate name "Toshi-kun". Sumire is the daughter of the head of a major pharmaceutical company and is the test subject for many of the artificial organs her father's company manufactures. She is shown to be fanatically devoted to Shinoyama despite his rejection of her romantic advances and feels Ray is only using him for her own purposes. In order to have her organs replaced by ones made by Shinoyama she purposely damages her own body. It is revealed in episode 12 by Red Ribbon that she was the recipient of Ray's original eyes.

Kenji is a young boy at the hospital who is kept in isolation behind a glass wall and appears to have some sort of immune deficiency. He is shown as having a psychic ability and is able to see Ray's memories when she puts her hand up to the glass. The end of the series suggests that there may be a way to cure his condition and it is implied by the nurses that he and Honoka (the clone) have begun to develop a mutual affection.

Numbers characters

"Numbers" are clones created by H Ring Man and are so-called because of numbers tattooed behind their right shoulders. In an effort to distinguish themselves they created names for themselves.

The H Ring Man is the head of the organization which created Ray and the "Numbers" children. He was responsible for the loss of Ray's eyes as well as the parasite which infected Red Ribbon. Eventually he split from the other two and began his own research into creating human clones who he hoped would keep the memories of their former lives, effectively a reincarnation of the deceased. This become an obsession to recreate his dead mother who died when he was 10 years old during the happiest days of his life. Her name was Honoka, hence the trademark "H" on his signet ring. Ray and One are revealed to be clones of his dead mother, but which he considered failures. The children Ray was raised with were referred to as "Numbers" and were all considered failures, as they were unable to recover the memories of the people who provided the genetic material. Consequently, they were used as unwilling organ donors as a form of "recycling", according to Dr. Kasugano.

Koichi is Ray's first love who proposed escaping with Ray from the "white room" in the clone farm when they were children. He reappears 10 years later requesting to meet Ray. He makes his first physical appearance after One attempts to kill Ray but he keeps his distance. It is later revealed that he is a clone of the H Ring Man whom he despises, but whom he worked with to track down Ray. He recreated a utopian "white room" which gathered all of the surviving Numbers and planned to include Ray and restore her to her original self. This involved retrieving her original eyes which were implanted into Sumire. He grows increasingly maniacal, and he shows the same level of obsession with Ray as the man he was cloned from had with his mother. He commits suicide by shooting himself in the head, when he believes that Ray has died.

One created her name by using her number 078 - 3 - 74 which equals 1 when subtracted. She and Ray were cloned from the same woman, though One shows much more violent and malevolent tendencies but unconditionally loves her creator based on the memories of her genetic original. She is distinguished from Ray physically by her red lipstick and longer, more unkempt hair. One claims to have conscious memories of her former life and as a result tries to kill Ray, whom she sees as competition for the affections of the H Ring Man. She shares a strained relationship with him and later she shot by Koichi under orders from the H Ring Man who pronounced her useless.

Saeko is a young girl who lives with her overprotective father, Tetsuzo Omoribe, in the village of Hotarudani. She is one of H Ring Man's earliest clone experiments and has a perfect resemblance to her father's dead wife of the same name. Some in their village believed her to be a product of witchcraft to bring back the dead. Often ill and out of school, she was at a hospital in Tokyo receiving supposedly life-saving treatment at the time all the other villagers disappeared. They were in fact wiped out to keep H Ring Man's cloning experiments secret. After it is discovered that she suffers the same fatal congenital heart defect that killed her mother she goes into a state of cardiac arrest and Ray performs emergency surgery on the girl despite knowing that Saeko has only a short time to live.

Honoka is a young girl of around 8 years old and the most successful clone because she has memories of her mother's life. She is shown comforting the H Ring Man like his real mother would have in the town he built in order to fulfill his fantasy of reliving his childhood before his mother died. She is shot in an attempt to protect the H Ring Man from Koichi, but luckily is taken to Sawa's hospital and survives. Her cloned memories begin to fade however she connects with Kenji, who helps her reconcile her past.

Blue is a boy who chose his name after his most prized possession, a blue marble. Ray is reunited with her old friend in the first chapter of the manga, and he also makes a small appearance in the last episode of the anime among the reunited Numbers.  Blue has no memories of his past, much like Red Ribbon, and Ray finds him under attack by H Ring Man's people.  He is deliberately infected with a deadly fungus planted within his lungs, which if Ray does not operate and remove within twenty minutes the spores of the fungus will be released and Blue, as well as those who inhale the spores, will die.  Ray is successful in her operation, though remains unsettled by Blue's reappearance, which is marked with the H Ring Man's people commenting that the H Ring Man is continually watching her.  Blue is hospitalized thereafter, where he remains an amnesiac.  Tightly clenched in his hand is the blue marble from his childhood; to protect Blue, Ray does not unclench his hand to prevent Blue from recalling his painful past before he is ready.

Other characters

Miyabi is a friend of Ray's who appears in episode 5. When they were in school together, Miyabi served as the miko of her family's shrine to the god Hitogami, a kami who wished to become human. During a ceremony in which she was fed an oyster-like organism Miyabi developed a very large and blister like growth and appeared to be possessed by a male entity, causing Ray to remove the growth on her own in her very first surgery. Ray speculated that the oyster was actually the spirit of Hitogami trying to possess the girl and gain a body as in the legend.

Black Jack is the surgeon who outfitted Ray with her X-ray eyes. He is originally from Osamu Tezuka's Black Jack manga and appears briefly in episode 1 and again at the end of episode 13.

Episode list

Cultural references
Because of copyright reasons, Black Jack was only alluded to as BJ and never seen fully in the original manga, but because the anime was produced by Osamu Tezuka's own studio he is able to appear fully in the anime (though still somewhat obscured) and be referred to by his original name. In Black Jack 21, the sequel to the Black Jack anime, Black Jack was referred to as "BJ" by the assassins hell bent on killing him.
At the end of episode 12 and throughout episode 13 the bandage over Ray's damaged eye may be a visual reference to another famous anime character with the same name; being Rei Ayanami of Neon Genesis Evangelion, who appears several times with a bandage over her right eye. The two characters also share the same red-colored eyes and distant personalities, as well as some elements of their unique origins.

Notes
 As indicated in episode 4, "Red Ribbon"

External links
 

2006 anime television series debuts
2006 Japanese television series endings
Akita Shoten manga
Anime series based on manga
Japanese medical television series
Maiden Japan
Medical anime and manga
Shōnen manga